Catherine Tait (born 1958) is a Canadian business executive who currently serves as the president and CEO of the Canadian Broadcasting Corporation. She succeeded Hubert Lacroix for the position after being appointed on April 3, 2018, and beginning her mandate on July 3, 2018. 

Tait is also the chair of the Global Task Force for Public Media, an initiative of the Public Media Alliance launched in September 2019.

Education 
Catherine Tait holds a Bachelor of Arts in literature and philosophy from the University of Toronto, a Master of Science from Boston University, and a Diplôme d’Études Approfondies in communications theory from the University of Paris II Panthéon-Assas.

Career

Media and culture industry 
Prior to joining CBC/Radio-Canada, Catherine Tait had worked in film and television production in Canada and the U.S. for more than three decades.

She served as a manager of Policy and Planning at Telefilm Canada in the 1980s, before going on to become Director and Cultural Attaché with the Canadian Cultural Centre in France from 1989 to 1991.

In Canada, Tait was president and COO of Salter Street Films from 1997 to 2001, producing such shows as the long-running CBC comedy This Hour Has 22 Minutes.

In 2002, she and film producer Liz Manne co-founded New York–based Duopoly Inc., an independent film, television and digital content company. Tait served as president until 2018. She also co-founded digital content provider iThentic in 2006 and the Canadian broadcaster Hollywood Suite in 2010.

President and CEO, CBC/Radio-Canada

Strategic directions 
Catherine Tait presented her vision for the public broadcaster in May 2019, with the unveiling of the Corporation’s new strategic plan, Your Stories, Taken to Heart. The plan covers five priorities: global reach, digital, kids content, regions and diversity.

In a speech to the Montreal Chamber of Commerce, Tait described how taking Canada to the world was the “spearhead” of CBC/Radio-Canada’s strategic plan, in order to counter the competitive threat of the digital giants. Since being appointed Chair of the Global Task Force for Public Media in September 2019, Tait has signed collaboration agreements (co-development and content sharing) between CBC/Radio-Canada and other public broadcasters around the world, such as the ABC, the BBC, France Télévisions, ZDF and RTBF.

As part of the public broadcaster’s ongoing digital transformation, in September 2018, Tait announced a new streaming service, CBC Gem, at Content Canada, an industry event in collaboration with the Toronto International Film Festival. The service launched in December 2018. Under her leadership, two new audio apps were developed – CBC Listen and Radio-Canada OHdio – providing a one-stop destination for all the public broadcaster’s audio content (music, podcasts and radio shows). Both apps were launched in fall 2019.

At the international Kidscreen Summit in February 2019, Tait committed to expanding the public broadcaster’s kids content offering, especially on CBC Gem. During her tenure, the Corporation also launched two news services for kids 13 and under: CBC Kids News in 2018 and MAJ (Mon actualité du jour) in 2019.

At the Banff World Media Festival in June 2019, Tait announced that she would ask the production companies with whom she does business to ensure that at least one key creative position – producer, director, writer, showrunner and lead performer – is held by members of visible minorities, Indigenous Peoples, persons with disabilities and members of the LGBT community.

In an interview with CBC/Radio-Canada reporters in Saskatchewan, Tait said she wanted to move more production to regional centres, particularly for radio and digital. This strategic priority has resulted in CBC stepping up its pop-up bureau approach at locations such as Stanley Mission, Saskatchewan; Winkler and Morden, Manitoba; northeast Calgary; and the Tsuut’ina First Nation in Alberta. CBC has also increased production outside Toronto, with the national radio show Cost of Living and the podcast West of Centre both being produced out of Calgary. The public broadcaster’s French-language network, Radio-Canada, has added new videojournalists in Yellowknife and Iqaluit to cover the North, as well as a more mobile workforce at its Abitibi-Témiscamingue station.

Comparison of Netflix to colonialism 
In 2019 Tait came under fire for likening Netflix's influence to cultural imperialism in India and parts of Africa. She said "I was thinking about the British Empire and how, if you were there and you were the viceroy of India, you would feel that you were doing only good for the people of India. Or similar, if you were in French Africa, you would think, I’m educating them, I’m bringing their resources to the world, and I’m helping them. There was a time when cultural imperialism was absolutely accepted. Fast forward to what happens after imperialism and the damage that can do to local communities. So all I would say is, let us be mindful of how it is we as Canadians respond to global companies coming into our country." TV critic John Doyle responded: "CBC Television’s weakness is its commitment to ordinary, middling-good TV, and it has become complacent about middling success. That’s CBC’s problem, one created by lack of imagination and laziness, not some imagined cultural imperialism."

References 

Tait, Catherine
Tait, Catherine
Tait, Catherine
Living people
1958 births